The Journal of Biosocial Science is a bimonthly peer-reviewed scientific journal covering the intersection of biology and sociology. It was the continuation of The Eugenics Review, published by the Galton Institute from 1909 till 1968. It obtained its current name in 1969, with volume numbering re-starting at 1, and switched publishers to Cambridge University Press. The editor-in-chief is Dr Alejandra Núñez-de la Mora (Universidad Veracruzana).

Abstracting and indexing
The journal is abstracted and indexed in:

According to the Journal Citation Reports, the journal has a 2021 impact factor of 2.148.

Notable studies
In 2006, the journal published a controversial study arguing that Ashkenazi Jews are more intelligent than other ethnic groups as a result of human evolution.

Past Editors
 Alan Sterling Parkes (1969-1978) 
 Derek F. Roberts (1979-1988) 
 C. G. Nicholas Mascie-Taylor (1989-2021)

References

External links

Biology journals
Sociology journals
Cambridge University Press academic journals
Publications established in 1909
Bimonthly journals
English-language journals
Demography journals
Genetics journals